Small is a weekly peer-reviewed scientific journal covering nanotechnology. It was established in 2005 as a monthly journal, switched to biweekly in 2009, and to weekly in 2015. It is published by Wiley-VCH and the editor-in-chief is José Oliveira. According to the Journal Citation Reports, the journal has a 2021 impact factor of 15.153.

See also
Advanced Materials
Advanced Functional Materials
Advanced Engineering Materials

References

External links

Materials science journals
Nanotechnology journals
Publications established in 2005
Wiley-VCH academic journals
Weekly journals
English-language journals